AIC may refer to:

Arts and entertainment
 Alice in Chains, American rock band
 Alice in Chains: AIC 23, a 2013 mockumentary
 Anime International Company, a Japanese animation studio
 Art Institute of Chicago, an art museum in Chicago

Business
 AIC Diversified Canada, a Canadian mutual fund company
 American Investment Council, formerly known as PEGCC, US trade association for the private equity and growth capital investment industry
 Asia Internet Coalition, an internet trade group in Asia
Association of Investment Companies, also known as The Association of Investment Trust Companies, UK trade association for closed-ended investment companies

Charitable organizations
 Advocates for Informed Choice, now called Interact Advocates for Intersex Youth, a U.S. NGO
 Alternative Information Center, a joint Palestinian-Israeli NGO
 American Indian Center, social and cultural center
 American Institute for Conservation, an American organization devoted to preserving historic works

Computing
 Adaptec integrated circuit
 Add-in card, or expansion card, a circuit board that adds functionality to a computer
 Apple Intermediate Codec, a video codec used on OS X

Economics
 Actual Individual Consumption, a measure of economic well-being alternative to Gross Domestic Product

Politics and government
 State Administration for Industry and Commerce, a Chinese regulatory agency
 African Independent Congress, a South African political party
 Arab–Israeli conflict, a long-running conflict between Israel and Arab countries
 American Iranian Council, a think tank devoted to improving US–Iranian relations
 Association Internationale du Congo, an organization promoting Leopold II's rule of the Congo and predecessor to the Congo Free State, active from 1879 to 1885
 Australian Intelligence Community, the government agencies that make up Australia's intelligence operations

Philosophy
 Animal–industrial complex, a term describing systematic and institutionalized exploitation of animals

Religion
 African Initiated Church, a Christian church founded by Africans, also known as African Independent Church, African Indigenous Church or African Instituted Church
 Africa Inland Church, a church in Eastern Africa related to Africa Inland Mission
 American Islamic Congress, an American Muslim organization
 Answers In Creation, an organization promoting Old Earth creationism

Schools
 Academia de la Inmaculada Concepción, a Catholic school in Mayagüez, Puerto Rico
 Alcanta International College, a private secondary school in Guangzhou, China
 American International College, a college in Springfield, Massachusetts, United States
 American Islamic College, a college in Chicago, United States
 Arizona International College, a former public college in Arizona, United States
 Art Institute of Colorado, a university in Denver, United States
 Associated Independent Colleges, a group of eight colleges in Queensland, Australia
 Auckland International College, a private secondary school in Auckland, New Zealand
 Australian Indigenous College, a former business college in Queensland, Australia
 Dwight D. Eisenhower School for National Security and Resource Strategy, formerly known as the Army Industrial College

Science 
 Akaike information criterion, estimates the quality of a statistical model, relative to other models
 American Institute of Chemists, an American chemistry organization
 Ampere Interrupting Capacity, the maximum safe current in an electrical circuit
 AIC (gene), which encodes the Aicardi syndrome protein
 Australian Institute of Criminology, an Australian research center on crime

Sports
 Anglo-Italian Cup, a football competition played from 1970 to 1996 between the UK and Italy
 Arkansas Intercollegiate Conference, a former college athletic conference competing in the National Association of Intercollegiate Athletics, all members competed in the state of Arkansas
 Associazione Italiana Calciatori (Italian Footballers' Association), a football association in Italy

Statistics/Machine Learning
Akaike information criterion, a measure of the relative quality of a statistical model, for a given data set

Transport and military
 Action Information Center, the tactical center on a warship or aircraft
 ICAO designator for Air India, an Indian airline
 Ammunition Identification Code, Ordnance Supply Catalog designation for ammunition used by the US Army Ordnance Corps from 1942 to 1958; see List of U.S. Army munitions by supply catalog designation
 Australian Instructional Corps, military unit, Australia

Other uses
 Aichach-Friedberg, a district in Bavaria, Germany
 Association Internationale de la Couleur (International Colour Association), an organization that studies colour